Ethmia zygospila is a moth in the family Depressariidae. It is found in Taiwan.

References

Moths described in 1934
zygospila